Darrall Macqueen is an independent children's television production company based in London, United Kingdom.  It was formed in 2000 by Billy Macqueen and Maddy Darrall.

History 
Darrall Macqueen's first production was a converged TV/web event week for ITV in January 2000 called Mouse. In 2002 Darrall Macqueen produced Smile, which ran from 2002 until 2007. Then they produced CBBC's interactive drama series UGetMe.

In 2004, Darrall Macqueen created a live-action comedy called The Crust, a 15-part urban sitcom.

In 2004, Darrall Macqueen made a series of 13 high octane game shows for CiTV called Play the Game, and, in 2005, Darrall Macqueen was asked to produce CiTV's thrill seeking action series Feel the Fear, starring Steve Wilson and Holly Willoughby.  In 2006 they produced 30 comedy animal tales for CiTV called Animal Spies, which featured the voice talent of Lenny Henry and Ricky Tomlinson.

In September 2005 Australian company Southern Star took a majority shareholding in Darrall Macqueen.  Southern Star, who already owned Carnival Films and Oxford Scientific Films in the UK, were then bought by Southern Cross, who in turn were purchased by Fairfax Media.  When Endemol took over Fairfax Media in 2009 Darrall Macqueen took back full control of the company.

At the 2006 Children's BAFTAs, Darrall Macqueen won the inaugural BAFTA for Production Company of the Year.

In 2007, Darrall Macqueen created Bear Behaving Badly for CBBC, a 26-part slapstick sitcom for 7–11 year olds. From 2008 to 2010, Darrall Macqueen created and produced weekend pre-school brand The Fluffy Club for ITV and GMTV.

In 2009, Darrall Macqueen developed a comedy animation series called Pet Squad with Irish comedian/writer Caimh McDonnell. In 2011, it won its first commission from CBeebies to make a pre-school series called Baby Jake.

In 2015, Darrall Macqueen with WildBrain (known as DHX Media at the time) and CBeebies rebooted classic British children's television series Teletubbies.

Awards 

 2005: Children's BAFTA to Smile for Best Interactive Programme
 2005: The Indie Award to Smile for Best Interactive Media
 2006: Children's BAFTA for Production Company of the Year
 2007: Children's BAFTA to Barney Harwood for Best Presenter
 2013: Broadcast Award to "Baby Jake" for Best Pre School Programme
 2016: Children's BAFTA to "Topsy and Tim" for Best Pre School Live Action
 2017: Broadcast Award to "Topsy and Tim" for Best Pre School Programme
 2022: Children's BAFTA to "Lovely Little Farm" for Best Pre School Live Action

Productions 

 Smile
 UGetMe
 The Crust
 Feel the Fear
 Bear Behaving Badly
 Hi-5 UK
 The Fluffy Club
 Baby Jake
 Topsy and Tim
 Teletubbies (2015)
 Chip and Potato
 Waffle the Wonder Dog
 Lovely Little Farm

References

External links 
 http://www.darrallmacqueen.com

Television production companies of the United Kingdom